Odd Langholm (born 8 November 1928) is a Norwegian economist and historian of economic thought. He spent his entire academic career at the Norwegian School of Economics and Business Administration, being a professor from 1966 to 1998.

Personal life
He was born in Haugesund as a son of Karl Johan Langholm (1891–1974) and Anna Stampen (1894–1976), who were both teachers. He was the younger brother of historian Sivert Langholm. In 1956 he married Grethe Togstad. They settled in Bergen.

Career
Langholm took the examen artium in 1947 and the business school exam in 1949. He then moved from Haugesund to Bergen, to study at the Norwegian School of Economics and Business Administration. He graduated with the siv.øk. degree in 1954. For the next years he worked as a lecturer there, and took the dr.oecon. degree at the same institution in 1964, on the thesis Tidshorisonten for deterministiske planleggingsmodeller i normativ bedriftsøkonomikk. He was the first person to take both the siv.øk. degree and the doctorate at the Norwegian School of Economics and Business Administration. He was promoted to professor in 1966.

After 1969 his focus shifted from business administration towards the study of mediaeval economic thought. Between 1979 and 1998 he published five works in this field, many derived from sources in Latin, a language in which he was skilled. These works were Price and Value in the Aristotelian Tradition. A Study in Scholastic Economic Sources (1979), Wealth and Money in the Aristotelian Tradition (1983), The Aristotelian Analyses of Usury (1984), Economics in the Medieval Schools. Wealth, Exchange, Value, Money and Usury according to the Paris Theological Tradition, 1200–1350 (1992) and The Legacy of Scholasticism in Economic Thought. Antecedents of Choice and Power (1998). This body of work has given him international recognition.

Langholm received an honorary degree at the Åbo Akademi University in 1992. For his sixtieth birthday, a Festschrift was issued. He retired from his professorship in 1998.

Works

Books

References

1928 births
Living people
Norwegian economists
20th-century Norwegian historians
Norwegian Latinists
Norwegian medievalists
Historians of economic thought
Norwegian School of Economics alumni
Academic staff of the Norwegian School of Economics
People from Haugesund